Mandeoksan (만덕산) is a mountain of Jeollanam-do, southwestern South Korea. It has an elevation of 409 metres.

Trail 

 Gangjin Baseurak-gil: it is home to BaekRyeon Temple, camellia groves and the House of Dasan - the Yubaecheo (house of exile) of Jeong Yak-yong, who was often referred to as “Dasan” and is known as a great thinker of the late Joseon period (1392-1910). It is a sacred mountain where “Dasan” and “Haejangseonsa” of BaekRyeon Temple built a friendship and ancient Koreans left trails of their lives over many years. Mount Mandeok is connected to another mountain called Mount Seokmun and there is a viaduct that links the two mountains.  

*Course: BaekRyeon Temple - Dasanchodang - Majeom village - Yongmun Temple - Seokmun park - Soseokmun - Doam Middle School- Doammyeon office (5 miles, 2 hours 30 minutes. Level: Moderate)

See also
List of mountains of Korea

References

Mountains of South Korea
Mountains of South Jeolla Province